Federal elections were held in Germany on 5 March 1933, after the Nazis lawfully acquired power pursuant to the terms of Weimar Constitution on 30 January 1933 and just six days after the Reichstag fire. Nazi stormtroopers had unleashed a widespread campaign of violence against the Communist Party (KPD), left-wingers, trade unionists, the Social Democratic Party of Germany, and the Centre Party. They were the last multi-party all-German elections until 1990.

The 1933 election followed the previous year's two elections (July and November) and Hitler's appointment as Chancellor. In the months before the 1933 election, SA and SS displayed "terror, repression and propaganda [...] across the land", and Nazi organizations "monitored" the vote process. In Prussia 50,000 members of the SS, SA and Der Stahlhelm were ordered to monitor the votes by acting Interior Minister Hermann Göring, as auxiliary police.

The Nazi Party (officially the National Socialist German Workers' Party or, in German, NSDAP) registered a large increase in votes in 1933 and gained a Reichstag majority together with its coalition partner, the German National People's Party (DNVP). This was the first time since 1930 that a governing coalition had held a parliamentary majority. However, despite waging a campaign of terror against their opponents, the Nazis only tallied 43.9 percent of the vote on their own, well short of a majority to govern alone.

This would be the last contested election held in Germany until after World War II. Despite now holding a bare working majority in the Reichstag, Hitler wanted more. Two weeks after the election, he was able to pass an Enabling Act on 23 March with the support of all non-left wing parties, which effectively gave Hitler dictatorial powers. Within months, the Nazis banned all other parties and turned the Reichstag into a rubberstamp legislature comprising only Nazis and pro-Nazi "guests".

Background
The Nazi seizure of power commenced on 30 January, when President Paul von Hindenburg appointed Hitler as Chancellor, who immediately urged the dissolution of the Reichstag and the calling of new elections. On his second day as Chancellor, Hitler opened his campaign with a nationwide radio address pledging to save the nation from the left-wing, which he castigated as "political nihilism." In early February, the Nazis "unleashed a campaign of violence and terror that dwarfed anything seen so far". Sturmabteilung stormtroopers began attacking trade union and Communist Party (KPD) offices and the homes of left-wingers.

In the second half of February, the violence was extended to the Social Democrats, with gangs of brownshirts breaking up Social Democrat meetings and beating up their speakers and audiences. Issues of Social Democratic newspapers were banned. Twenty newspapers of the Centre Party, a party of Catholic Germans, were banned in mid-February for criticising the new government. Government officials known to be Centre Party supporters were dismissed from their offices, and stormtroopers violently attacked party meetings in Westphalia. Only the Nazi Party and the German National People's Party were allowed to campaign untouched.

Six days before the scheduled election date, the German parliament building was set alight in the Reichstag fire, allegedly by the Dutch Communist Marinus van der Lubbe. That event reduced the popularity of the KPD and enabled Hitler to persuade Hindenburg to pass the Reichstag Fire Decree as an emergency decree according to Article 48 of the Weimar Constitution. The emergency law removed many civil liberties and allowed the arrest of Ernst Thälmann and 4,000 other leaders and members of the KPD shortly before the election, suppressing the Communist vote and consolidating the position of the Nazis.

Although Hitler could have banned the KPD outright, he opted not to do so. He feared a violent Communist uprising in the event of a ban, and he also believed the KPD's presence on the ballot could siphon off votes away from the Social Democrats. Instead, he opted to simply have Communists functionaries jailed by the thousands. The courts and prosecutors, both already hostile to the KPD long before 1933, obligingly agreed with the line that since the Reichstag fire was a Communist plot, KPD membership was an act of treason. As a result, for all intents and purposes, the KPD was "outlawed" on the day the Reichstag Fire Decree took effect and "completely banned" as of the day of the election. While the Social Democrats (SPD) were then not as heavily oppressed as the Communists, the Social Democrats were also restricted in their actions, as the party's leadership had already fled to Prague, and many members were acting only from the underground. Hence, the Reichstag fire is widely believed to have had a major effect on the outcome of the election. As a replacement parliament building and for 10 years to come, the new parliament used the Kroll Opera House for its meetings.

The resources of big business and the state were thrown behind the Nazis' campaign to achieve saturation coverage all over Germany. Brownshirts and SS patrolled and marched menacingly through the streets of cities and towns. A "combination of terror, repression and propaganda was mobilized in every... community, large and small, across the land". Irene von Goetz wrote, "In a decree issued on 17 February 1933, Göring ordered the Prussian police force to make unrestrained use of firearms in operations against political opponents (the so-called Schießerlass, or shooting decree)".

To ensure a Nazi majority in the vote, Nazi organisations also "monitored" the vote process. In Prussia, 50,000 members of the SS, SA and Der Stahlhelm were ordered to monitor the votes as so-called deputy sheriffs or auxiliary police (Hilfspolizei) in another decree by acting Interior Minister Hermann Göring.

Results

Aftermath

Despite achieving a much better result than in the November 1932 election, the Nazis did not do as well as Hitler had hoped. In spite of massive violence and voter intimidation, the Nazis won only 43.9% of the vote, rather than the majority that he had expected.

Therefore, Hitler was forced to maintain his coalition with the DNVP to control the majority of seats. The Communists (KPD) lost about a quarter of their votes, and the Social Democrats suffered only moderate losses. Although the KPD had not been formally banned, it was a foregone conclusion that the KPD deputies would never be allowed to take their seats. Within a few days, all KPD representatives had been placed under arrest or gone into hiding.

Although the Nazi-DNVP coalition had enough seats to conduct the basic business of government, Hitler needed a two-thirds majority to pass the Enabling Act, which allowed the Cabinet, effectively the Chancellor to enact laws without the approval of the Reichstag for four years. With certain exceptions, such laws could deviate from the Weimar Constitution. Leaving nothing to chance, the Nazis used the provisions of the Reichstag Fire Decree to arrest all 81 Communist deputies and to keep several Social Democrats out of the chamber.

Hitler then obtained the necessary supermajority by persuading the Centre Party to vote with him with regard to the Enabling Act. The bill was passed on 23 March with 444 votes for and 94 against. Only the Social Democrats, led by Otto Wels, opposed the measure, which came into effect on 27 March. The bill's provisions turned the government into a de facto legal dictatorship.

Within four months, the other parties had been shuttered by outright banning or Nazi terror, and Germany had become formally a one-party state. Although three more elections were held during the Nazi era, voters were presented with a single list of Nazis and guest candidates, and voting was not secret.

References

External links
1933 elections German Historic Museum 

Germany
1933 03
1933 03
1933 03
March 1933 events